Jamesburg (formerly, Jamesburgh) is an unincorporated community in Monterey County, California.

John James founded the town in 1867. The Jamesburgh post office opened in 1886, changed its name to Jamesburg in 1894, and closed for good in 1935.

In 1968, COMSAT built the Jamesburg Earth Station - no longer operational - in the area. Local legend has it that Jamesburg Earth Station relayed Neil Armstrong's famous Apollo 11 statement from the moon in July 1969: “it’s one small step for a man, one giant leap for mankind.”

Government
At the county level, Jamesburg is represented on the Monterey County Board of Supervisors by Supervisor Mary Adams.

In the United States House of Representatives, Jamesburg is in

References

Unincorporated communities in California
Unincorporated communities in Monterey County, California
Populated places established in 1867
1867 establishments in California
Big Sur